Talensi is one of the constituencies represented in the Parliament of Ghana. It elects one Member of Parliament (MP) by the first past the post system of election. Talensi is located in the Talensi-Nabdam district  of the Upper East Region of Ghana.

Boundaries
The seat is located within the Talensi-Nabdam District in the Upper East Region of Ghana.

Members of Parliament

Elections

Following Robert Nachinab Doameng (NPP) becoming the Paramount Chief of Tongo, a by-election was held resulting in Benson Tongo Baba of the NDC being elected MP for Talensi with a margin of 3521.

See also
List of Ghana Parliament constituencies

References 

Parliamentary constituencies in the Upper East Region